Delia Elva Cruz Vega (born 26 February 1955) she is a Mexican professor and researcher at the Monterrey Institute of Technology and Higher Studies and its Centro de Innovación y Transferencia en Salud (Center for Innovation and Transference in Health). Her research work has been recognized with Level II membership in Mexico's Sistema Nacional de Investigadores.

Personal 
Delia was born in Tula de Allende, Hidalgo, Mexico. But her professional career and research has been made in Monterrey City. She started her research at the Mexican Social Security Institute, (Instituto Mexicano del Seguro Social, IMSS, its Spanish acronym) and She is currently a professor and researcher at the Monterrey Institute of Technology and Higher Studies and its Centro de Innovación y Transferencia en Salud (Center for Innovation and Transference in Health). Her research work has been recognized with Level II membership in Mexico's Sistema Nacional de Investigadores.

References

See also
List of Monterrey Institute of Technology and Higher Education faculty

Academic staff of the Monterrey Institute of Technology and Higher Education
Living people
1955 births